Goran Valka (born 1 August 1983) known by his stage name Franco Balkan, is a Bosnian rapper and hip hop recording artist, songwriter and producer. He gain his popularity among younger audience after the release of his first singles and studio album Superstar. Also, he was nominated for 2020 Music Awards Ceremony.

Biography 
He was born in Sarajevo on 1 August 1983. When it comes to his private life, he attended primary and secondary education in Sarajevo. In 2012, he graduated in the field of Communication studies and 2 years later, he received a master's degree in International Relations and Diplomacy at the Faculty of Political Science in Sarajevo. He began his musical career in 2002 in the rap-rock band Corbansick, where he learned to play keyboards, write lyrics and turntables and samples. As a songwriter, musician and producer, he was involved for many years. He never attended music school, but still he mastered the musical instruments piano and drums on his own. He was one of the founding members of the rap-rock band Corbansick, before leaving music back in 2006. Besides his affinity for music, he was professionally involved in politics where he served as a member of the Board of directors of the Federal Pension and Disability Insurance Institute in Sarajevo (2014-2018).

Career

2002–2006: Beginning with Corbansick

In early 2002, he formed a rap-rock band Corbansick. with his friend and guitarist Feđa Šehić, who later met other band members with whom they've set out to create a popular sound between traditional alternative rock and hip-hop mixed with experimental musical styles such as Nu Metal and Rapcore. The name Corbansick was chosen because it portrayed best what the band was essentially at the time: sick, core, band. Goran wrote music and lyrics for the band. With Corbansick he recorded several songs such as Broken and Pissed Off, and he made several notable performances and won several awards. After the band's dispute on 3 September 2006, Stefan Pejović (drummer), Haris Kurspahić (bass guitar) and the singer Igor Benić left the band. Later on, new members joined Corbansick: Ensar Bistrivoda (vocals), Dino Osmić (drummer) and Muhamed Mulaosmanović (bass guitar). Shortly afterward, Goran left the band because of his private reasons.

2018–2019: Solo career
After a ten years hiatus, he decides to return to music in 2018, but in a completely different music genre, during which he began to build his own independent singing career, taking the name Franco as a pseudonym. At the beginning of 2019, he signed an exclusive publishing contract with Tempo Digital record label, owned by Almir Ajanović, an established producer and musician from Sarajevo. Because his stage name Franco was already in use by several international artists, in August 2019 he decided to change it in Franco Balkan (adding Balkan as a simple connection to the region which he liked). In the terms of his musical work, Goran is the major lyrics and music author of all of his songs. So far, he has released several singles and one studio album "Superstar".

2019–2020: Album Superstar 

Superstar. is his first studio album which he recorded and released on 21 December 2020. The album contains a total of 9 songs and they were recorded for two years in Sarajevo. Album was supported by singles: Mačka, Fight, Dante, Lova, Rekla mi je, Varam and Voljeću dok zaspim. Along with Goran, many notable musicians, singers and producers from Bosnia and Herzegovina such as Almir Ajanović, Damir Bečić, Tarik Mulaomerović, Adnan Pacoli and Peđa Hart worked on it. Backing vocals and other vocal parts on the album were recorded by Dalal Midhat-Talakić, Zorana Guja, Damir Bečić and Goran himself. The executive producer of the album was Almir Ajanović, while the publisher was Tempo Digital. The songs on the album are a mixture of several music genres. Auto-Tune Pop rap and melodic singing predominate, with admixtures of EDM, Dance and trap rhythms, which are often mixed with Reggaeton, Dancehall and Balkan ethno sounds. The lyrics are a bit explicit and sexually oriented, along with slightly milder versions of light instrumentals and love ballads.

Music style 
His musical style is different and unique. In his songs, he combines several world genres such as Pop, Hip Hop, Rap, EDM, Trap, Dance, Reggaeton, Dancehall and specific Balkan's ethno style. Songs are melodic and lyrics are explicit and sexually oriented.

Awards and nominations 
 MAC 2020 – At the end of 2019, he was nominated in the New Artist category for the song Fight. Unfortunately, he didn't succeed at the time.

Discography

Singles 
 Mačka (2019)
 Fight (2019)
 Dante (2019)
 Lova (2020)
 Rekla mi je (2020)
 Varam (2020)
 Voljeću dok zaspim (2020)
 Tata (2020)
 Komiran (2020)

Studio albums 
 Superstar (2020)

Music videos 
 Mačka (2019)
 Fight (2019)
 Dante (2020)
 Lova (2020)
 Rekla mi je (2020)
 Varam (2020)
 Voljeću dok zaspim (2020)

References

External links 

1983 births
Living people
Singers from Sarajevo
Bosnia and Herzegovina hip hop musicians
Bosnia and Herzegovina pop singers
Bosnia and Herzegovina musicians
Bosnia and Herzegovina rappers